Joel Rush (born August 26, 1981) is an American actor and model, best known for his role as Edward 'Eddie' Willis in the Oprah Winfrey Network prime time soap opera, If Loving You Is Wrong.

Life and career
Rush was born in Logansport, Indiana. In 2009, he was the runner-up of the first season of ABC competition reality show True Beauty. He later began appearing on television, include a recurring role on the NBC daytime soap opera Days of Our Lives, and guest starring roles in Make It or Break It, Big Time Rush, Betty White's Off Their Rockers, and Femme Fatales. Rush also appeared in a number of gay romantic comedy films, including Eating Out: Drama Camp (2011), Eating Out: The Open Weekend (2011), and Love or Whatever (2012).

In 2014, Rush was cast as Edward 'Eddie' Willis in the Oprah Winfrey Network prime time soap opera, If Loving You Is Wrong. He later has appeared in films Bachelors (2015), Naked (2017), Honey: Rise Up and Dance (2018), This Is Our Christmas (2018), A Madea Family Funeral (2019) and The Trap (2019).. On television, he had a recurring role on Netflix series Lucifer as Zadkiel in 2021, and on HBO comedy The Righteous Gemstones in 2022.

References

External links

21st-century American male actors
American male television actors
American male soap opera actors
Living people
1981 births